is a public holiday in Japan. It takes place on May 3 in celebration of the enactment of the 1947 Constitution of Japan. It is a part of the collection of holidays known as Golden Week.

History
After the bombings of Hiroshima and Nagasaki in 1945, the Showa Emperor announced unconditional surrender to allied forces. Over the next two years, Japan and U.S. General Douglas MacArthur cooperated in drafting the new constitution, which was ratified by the House of Representatives on August 24, 1946, by the House of Peers on October 6, and by the Privy Council on October 29, then promulgated by the Emperor on November 3, 1946, the Emperor Meiji's birthday, and came into effect on May 3, 1947.

Initially, Prime Minister Shigeru Yoshida wanted to observe Constitution Memorial Day on November 3 because it was already a holiday; furthermore, the date of the signing also coincided with the start of trials by the International Military Tribunal for the Far East. However, he did not get his way and the Public Holiday Law of 1948  set the date as May 3.

Constitution Memorial Day is often chosen as a day to reflect on the meaning of democracy and Japanese government. For instance, in 2003, a number of newspapers featured editorials regarding the constitution's Article 9, which declares the country as a pacifist nation.

Celebration 
Constitution Memorial Day is a time to reminisce the events of Japan's history. The National Diet opens to the public on 3 May every year, for tours of the building. Constitution Memorial Day in Japan is a part of Golden Week. In 2019 a one-off Platinum Week was held, with extra events and a longer duration, to commemorate the inauguration of the new emperor, Naruhito.

See also
 Constitution Day in other countries
 Constitution of Japan
 Holidays of Japan
 Politics of Japan

References

External links
Kenpo Kinenbi in Japan – Japan Guide
Japan's Constitution Memorial Day

Public holidays in Japan
May observances
Constitution days